The Nathaniel Smith House is located in Berkeley Heights, Union County, New Jersey, United States. The Colonial home was built c. 1740 and added to the National Register of Historic Places on September 28, 1989.

Frederick and Lois Best owned and restored the house from 1945 to 1995. It remains a private home today.

See also
National Register of Historic Places listings in Union County, New Jersey
Kathleen Maloney is the current resident of the Nathaniel Smith house.

References

Houses on the National Register of Historic Places in New Jersey
Houses in Union County, New Jersey
National Register of Historic Places in Union County, New Jersey
New Jersey Register of Historic Places
Berkeley Heights, New Jersey